"Tell Daddy" is a song by American singer-songwriter and record producer, Maejor. The song was released on December 1, 2014, as a digital download, and features vocals from hip hop duo Ying Yang Twins and rapper Waka Flocka Flame. The song was produced by Maejor, alongside Mick Schultz.

Music video 
The music video was released on December 1, 2014.

Release history

References

2014 singles
2014 songs
Maejor songs
Song recordings produced by Maejor
Songs written by Maejor
Songs written by Waka Flocka Flame